Ravnen (The Raven) was a Danish political magazine published by the Danish labour movement from 2 April 1876 to 7 January 1877 and again from 6 October 1878 until 15 July 1921. The first editor was Harald Brix.

See also
List of magazines in Denmark

References

1876 establishments in Denmark
1921 disestablishments in Denmark
Political magazines published in Denmark
Danish-language magazines
Defunct magazines published in Denmark
Defunct political magazines
Magazines established in 1876
Magazines disestablished in 1921
Socialist magazines